The 2021 Copa Verde Finals was the final two-legged tie that decided the 2021 Copa Verde, the 8th season of the Copa Verde, Brazil's regional cup football tournament organised by the Brazilian Football Confederation.

The finals were contested in a two-legged home-and-away format between Vila Nova, from Goiás, and Remo, from Pará.

The two matches ended in a scoreless draw, which meant the title was decided by a penalty shoot-out, which Remo won 4–2 to claim their first Copa Verde title.

Teams

Road to the final
Note: In all scores below, the score of the home team is given first.

Format
The finals were played on a home-and-away two-legged basis. If tied on aggregate, the penalty shoot-out was used to determine the winner.

Matches

First leg

Second leg

{| width="100%"
|valign="top" width="40%"|

See also
2022 Copa do Brasil

References

Copa Verde Finals